The Appellate Division Courthouse of New York State, First Department (also known as Appellate Division of the Supreme Court of the State of New York) is a historic court house located at 35 East 25th Street at the corner of Madison Avenue, across from Madison Square Park, in Manhattan, New York City. The building is three stories, with a basement; the central entrance faces 25th Street.

Architecture

Exterior 
The marble Beaux-Arts courthouse, in the style of an 18th-century English country house, was designed by James Brown Lord and built in 1896−1899. It is considered to be an "outstanding" example of the City Beautiful movement. Some 25 percent of the cost was spent on sculpture, a huge sum at the time. At the time of its construction, the American Architect and Building News predicted that "the rest of the country will envy New York the possession of this building." In 1900, Charles DeKay wrote in The Independent that the courthouse "shines like an ivory casket among boxes of ordinary maple."

Sixteen sculptors worked on the courthouse, all members of the then-newly formed National Sculpture Society. In 1928, The New Yorker called the building "the rather pleasant little Appellate Court House with its ridiculous adornment of mortuary statuary."

Sculpture 
The exterior features sculptures in white marble on subjects related to law.  Karl Bitter's Peace is the central grouping on the balustrade by Madison Square. Daniel Chester French's Justice is the central grouping on 25th Street. Justice is flanked by Power and Study, also by French.

Charles Henry Niehaus's Triumph of Law, described as a "giant pedimental group" on "a screen of six Corinthian columns, rising from several groups of allegorical sculpture,"  fronts 25th Street. Thomas Shields Clarke sculpted a group of four female caryatids on the Madison Avenue front, at the third-floor level, representing the seasons; Summer holds a sickle and a sheaf of wheat.

On the roof, there are single standing figure sculptures, depicting historical, religious, and legendary lawgivers. These statues are of the same height and proportion, are robed, and appear with various attributes associated with the law, such as book, scroll, tablet, sword, charter, or scepter. The first statue on the Madison Avenue side is Confucius by Philip Martiny, with the Peace group by Karl Bitter in the middle, and Moses by William Couper at the other end. Facing south on the 25th Street side is Edward Clark Potter's Zoroaster, which was along with all 25th Street statues moved down one bay when Charles Albert Lopez's Mohammed was removed in 1955, following protests against this image of the prophet from Muslim nations. Next on this side is Jonathan Scott Hartley's Alfred the Great, followed by George Edwin Bissell's Lycurgus and Herbert Adams's Solon. Next to Solon is the Justice set of sculptures by French (described above), and then three more statues: John Talbott Donoghue's Saint Louis, Henry Augustus Lukeman's Manu, and Henry Kirke Bush-Brown's Justinian. At street level, "two pedestals holding two monumental seated figures" of Wisdom and Force by Frederick Ruckstull (born Ruckstuhl) flank stairs leading to a portico.

Controversy arose in 2022 when a new sculpture, entitled "NOW", was temporarily added to the exterior to replace one which had been previously removed. The gold colored statue, which contained various features such as horns, tentacles in place of arms and lace jabot  was said to pay homage to Ruth Bader Ginsburg. It was ridiculed in various media sources as being Satanic.

Holocaust Memorial 
The Madison Avenue facade contains a Holocaust Memorial by Harriet Feigenbaum. It was commissioned in 1988 and dedicated in 1990.

Interior 
Ten artists were commissioned by Lord, with the assistance of the National Society of Mural Painters, to execute allegorical murals for the courthouse interior. By spring 1898, Henry Siddons Mowbray (Transmission of Law), Robert Reid, Willard Leroy Metcalf, and Charles Yardley Turner were selected for the murals in the entrance hall, while Edwin Howland Blashfield, Henry Oliver Walker (Wisdom of the Law), Edward Simmons (Justice of the Law), Kenyon Cox (The Reign of Law), Joseph Lauber (Judicial Virtues), and Alfred Collins were selected for the murals in the courtroom. Specially-designed furniture was made by Herter Brothers.

History
Before the courthouse was built, the Appellate Division, First Department, of New York State Supreme Court had occupied rented quarters on Fifth Avenue and 19th Street. Plans for the new building were first filed in 1896. The building plans were jointly approved in June 1896 by the city sinking fund commissioners and the Appellate Division justices. The Appellate Division, First Department formally took possession of the new courthouse on January 2, 1900. The budget for the building was $700,000, but only $633,768 was spent.

The exterior of the building was designated a New York City landmark in 1966. The interior of the courthouse was designated a New York City landmark in 1981, and it was added to the National Register of Historic Places in 1982.  The building was restored in 2000 by the architectural firm of Platt Byard Dovell White.

Gallery

See also
List of New York City Designated Landmarks in Manhattan from 14th to 59th Streets
National Register of Historic Places listings in Manhattan from 14th to 59th Streets
New York County Courthouse

References
Notes

Bibliography
Temple of Justice: The Appellate Division Courthouse, the catalog for an exhibition sponsored by the Architectural League of New York and the Association of the Bar of the City of New York, June 24 to July 22, 1977

External links

Government buildings on the National Register of Historic Places in Manhattan
Government buildings completed in 1899
Courthouses on the National Register of Historic Places in New York City
New York City Designated Landmarks in Manhattan
Flatiron District
1899 establishments in New York City
Sculptures by Daniel Chester French
New York City interior landmarks